House of Worship is the fifteenth studio and third praise and worship album by Christian singer-songwriter Twila Paris released on March 11, 2003. It would be Paris' final album on Sparrow Records. The album is Paris' third praise and worship album following Sanctuary and Perennial: Songs for the Seasons of Life. Paris has written and recorded ten original songs and has re-recorded two of her classic songs "We Bow Down" and "We Will Glorify." Paris' original song "God of All" was released as a radio single and has climbed to number one on Radio and Records' Christian Inspirational chart. House of Worship debuted and peaked at number 28 on the Billboard Top Christian Albums chart.

Track listing 
All songs written by Twila Paris
"God of All" - 5:05
"We Bow Down" (re-recording) - 2:52
"You Are God" - 4:00
"For Eternity" - 3:55
"Glory and Honor" - 4:25
"Come Emmanuel" - 3:26
"Fill My Heart" - 4:49
"Make Us One" - 3:22
"I Want the World to Know" - 5:09
"Not My Own" - 4:16
"Christ in Us" - 2:58
"We Will Glorify" (re-recording) - 3:17

Personnel 
 Twila Paris – lead vocals 
 Shane Keister – acoustic piano, Hammond B3 organ
 Jamie Kenney – synthesizers 
 Tom Bukovac – electric guitars 
 Jerry McPherson – electric guitars
 Tom Hemby – acoustic guitars, mandolin, bass, percussion, arrangements
 Mark Hill – bass 
 Leland Sklar – bass
 Dan Needham – drums 
 Neal Wilkinson – drums 
 Eric Darken – percussion 
 Ken Lewis – percussion 
 Stuart Duncan – fiddle
 David Davidson – strings
 Carl Gorodetzky – strings
 Bob Mason – strings
 Pamela Sixfin – strings 
 Kristin Wilkinson – strings 
 Carl Marsh – string arrangements 
 Leanne Albrecht – backing vocals 
 Lisa Bevill – backing vocals 
 Nirva Dorsaint – backing vocals 
 Darwin Hobbs – backing vocals 
 Fiona Mellett – backing vocals 
 Michael Mellett – backing vocals 
 Gene Miller – backing vocals 
 Christy Nockels – backing vocals
 Leanne Palmore – backing vocals 
 Chance Scoggins – backing vocals 
 Jerard Woods – backing vocals 
 Jovaun Woods – backing vocals 

Production
 Brad O'Donnell – executive producer 
 Brown Bannister – producer 
 Steve Bishir – track recording, overdub recording, mixing 
 Bill Deaton – fiddle recording 
 Hank Nirider – track recording assistant, overdub recording assistant, mix assistant 
 Leslie Richter – track recording assistant
 Fred Paragano – digital editing 
 Steve Hall – mastering at Future Disc (North Hollywood, California)
 Traci Sterling Bishir – project manager 
 Michelle Bentrem – project management assistant
 Proper Management – management

Critical reception 

Ashleigh Kittle of AllMusic said of House of Worship that the album "features ten new songs as well as two new versions of the well-loved classics 'We Bow Down' and 'We Will Glorify.' Highly piano-oriented, the release can best be described as simple, yet moving. The album's production tends toward organic, not striving to dazzle listeners with innovative approaches, instead seeking to draw them into worship through simplicity." Kittle also mentions that "Paris' voice continues to achieve greater maturity with each release. Her vocals are bathed in what seems a contradiction: confident humility. While her voice comes across as confident and strong because of years of experience and faithful use, at the same time her vocals contain a gentle humbleness as she acknowledges her need for God through song."

Tony Cummings of Cross Rhythms has stated that Paris "has always included worship music in her repertoire and in fact her 'We Bow Down' is one of the most popular of all contemporary choruses. There are re-recordings of 'We Bow Down' and 'We Will Glorify' here, plus 10 newly written worship songs. Twila sings with her usual sweet purity and the musicians around her are top class (catch the violin solo by Stuart Duncan on 'You Are God')."

Charts

Radio singles

References 

2003 albums
Twila Paris albums
Sparrow Records albums
Albums produced by Brown Bannister